Destin Damachoua (born August 17, 1986) is a Central African-French basketball player who played for the University of New Orleans. He is also a member of the Central African Republic national basketball team.

Damachoua moved to the United States after his senior year of high school in France.  He originally committed to Duquesne University out of the Master's School in West Simsbury, Connecticut in 2006, but never played for the team.  Instead, Damachoua played JUCO basketball for Polk Community College in Florida where he was a two-time All-Sun Coast Conference performer.  In his first season with the Privateers, Damachoua played primarily off the bench, averaging 2.3 PPG.

Damachoua played for the Central African Republic national basketball team at the 2005 and 2009 FIBA Africa Championship, helping the team to quarterfinal appearances at both tournaments.

References

1986 births
Living people
Black French sportspeople
Citizens of the Central African Republic through descent
Central African Republic men's basketball players
French expatriate basketball people in the United States
French men's basketball players
French sportspeople of Central African Republic descent
Junior college men's basketball players in the United States
New Orleans Privateers men's basketball players
Point guards
Polk State College alumni
Shooting guards
Basketball players from Paris
CEP Lorient players